National Cycle Network (NCN) Route 166 is a Sustrans regional route in the Yorkshire Wolds between Kirkham and Hunmanby. It is one of 5 NCN routes that make up the 146 mile Yorkshire Wolds Cycle Route. Created in 2011 it is fully open and signed.

Route 
The entire  route is on road, along quiet country lanes. The western end is at Kirkham, North Yorkshire, where it joins the north western end of NCN 167. It passes through the town of Norton-on-Derwent and then the villages of Settrington, Duggleby, Kirby Grindalythe, Sledmere, Weaverthorpe and Foxholes on its way to its eastern end at Hunmanby. Here it meets NCN 1.

The Yorkshire Wolds is a rolling landscape, flat sections are few.

Heading east, the steeper gradients are the climbs from Foxholes and from Settrington. Here the route climbs a scarp slop to its high point at Settrington Beacon. Westward, the climbs are gentler dip slopes with the climb from Duggleby to Settrington Beacon being the only significant challenge.

Related NCN Routes 

Route 166 meets the following routes:
167 at Kirkham 
1 at Hunmanby 

NCN 166 is part of the Yorkshire Wolds Cycle Route with:

References

External links 

 National Route 166 on the Sustrans website.

Cycleways in England
Cycling in Yorkshire
Yorkshire Wolds